This is a list of entertainers who performed at the Araneta City complex in Cubao, Quezon City, Philippines, either at the Smart Araneta Coliseum or the New Frontier Theater.

Smart Araneta Coliseum

1990s

2000s

2010s

2020s
Note: Many of the 2020 events were scheduled to happen in 2020, but were postponed/cancelled as a result of the COVID-19 pandemic in the Philippines.

New Frontier Theater

Note: From its re-opening in 2015 to September 2018, it was known as the Kia Theatre.

See also
 List of entertainment events at the SM Mall of Asia complex
 List of events held at the Philippine Arena

Notes

References

External links
 Big Dome Legacy – Compilation of events at the Smart Araneta Coliseum

Metro Manila-related lists
Events in Metro Manila
Entertainment events in the Philippines
Lists of events by venue